John Kevin "Jake" Ellzey Sr. (born January 24, 1970) is an American politician and former military officer serving as the U.S. representative for Texas's 6th congressional district. A member of the Republican Party, he previously served as a member of the Texas House of Representatives for the 10th district from January to July 2021. He served in the United States Navy as a fighter pilot, completing tours in Afghanistan and Iraq.

Early life and education
Ellzey was born in Amarillo, Texas, and raised in Perryton. He earned a Bachelor of Science degree in political science from the United States Naval Academy in 1992. Ellzey was deployed nine times in his 20 years in the Navy before becoming a commercial airline pilot.

Career

Since retiring from the Navy, Ellzey has worked as a pilot for Southwest Airlines and as a consultant. He was also a social aide in the White House Office during the Bush administration. From 2012 to 2018, he was one of five commissioners of the Texas Veterans Commission.

In 2018, Ellzey was an unsuccessful candidate for Texas's 6th congressional district. During his campaign, he was endorsed by The Dallas Morning News. He placed second in the Republican primary, behind Ron Wright, who won the general election.

Ellzey was elected to the Texas House of Representatives in 2020. He took office on January 12, 2021. He resigned in July 2021 to take his seat in Congress. Governor Greg Abbott set August 31, 2021, as the special election date for the Texas State House of Representatives District 10 seat that Ellzey vacated. Republican Brian Harrison won the seat, defeating the representative who previously held the seat, John Wray.

U.S. House of Representatives

Elections

2021 special 

On February 26, 2021, Ellzey announced his candidacy in Texas's 6th congressional district special election to replace Ron Wright, who died in office on February 7. In the 23-candidate nonpartisan blanket primary, Ellzey finished second to Wright's widow Susan, who had been endorsed by former President Donald Trump, and 354 votes ahead of Democrat Jana Sanchez. On May 2, Sanchez conceded to Ellzey. Governor Greg Abbott set July 27 as the special election runoff date. Ellzey defeated Wright in the runoff, 53% to 47%. He was sworn in on July 30, 2021.

Committee assignments
 Committee on Veterans Affairs
 Committee on Science, Space and Technology

Caucus memberships 
 Republican Main Street Partnership

Electoral history

2018

2020
Election results:

2021

2021 (runoff)

Personal life
Ellzey and his wife Shelby have two children. They live near Midlothian, Texas.

References

External links
Campaign website
Official House website

|-

|-

1970 births
21st-century American politicians
Aviators from Texas
Living people
Republican Party members of the Texas House of Representatives
Military personnel from Texas
People from Perryton, Texas
Republican Party members of the United States House of Representatives from Texas
United States Naval Academy alumni
United States Naval Aviators
United States Navy officers
United States Navy personnel of the Iraq War
United States Navy personnel of the War in Afghanistan (2001–2021)